Fetal surgery also known as antenatal surgery, prenatal surgery, is a growing branch of maternal-fetal medicine that covers any of a broad range of surgical techniques that are used to treat congenital abnormalities in fetuses who are still in the pregnant uterus. There are three main types: open fetal surgery, which involves completely opening the uterus to operate on the fetus; minimally invasive fetoscopic surgery, which uses small incisions and is guided by fetoscopy and sonography; and percutaneous fetal therapy, which involves placing a catheter under continuous ultrasound guidance.

Fetal intervention is relatively new. Advancing technologies allow earlier and more accurate diagnosis of diseases and congenital problems in a fetus.

Fetal surgery draws principally from the fields of surgery, obstetrics and gynecology, and pediatrics- especially the subspecialties of neonatology (care of newborns, especially high-risk ones), maternal-fetal medicine (care of high-risk pregnancies), and pediatric surgery. It often involves training in obstetrics, pediatrics, and mastery of both invasive and non-invasive surgery, which require several years of residency and at least one fellowship (usually lasting more than one year each), to become proficient. It is possible in the U.S. to become trained in this approach whether one started in obstetrics, pediatrics, or surgery. Because of the very high risk and high complexity of these cases, they are usually performed at Level I trauma centers in large cities, at academic medical centers which provide the full spectrum of maternal and newborn care. This includes a high level neonatal intensive care unit, suitable operating theaters and equipment, and access to many surgeons and physicians, nurse specialists, therapists, and a social work and counseling team. The cases can be referred from multiple levels of hospitals from many miles, sometimes across state and provincial lines. In continents other than North America and Europe, these centers are not as numerous, though the techniques are spreading.

Most congenital conditions either do not require, or are not treatable through, fetal intervention. Those which are involve anatomical problems, for which in utero treatment is both feasible and can significantly improve the fetus’s continuing development and survival. Addressing anticipated concerns prior to birth increases the probability of a healthy baby, with few long-term health problems related to the treated condition.

Fetal intervention involves risk to fetus and pregnant patient alike. In addition to the general risks associated with any surgery, there is also a risk that scarring of the uterus will lead to difficulties with future pregnancies. This risk is higher than for a typical Cesarean section, for several reasons:
 the incision is usually a classical vertical one, with a greater risk of complications in subsequent pregnancies;
 the longer duration of the surgery, while the fetal intervention is performed;
 a second surgery is required days or weeks later – a Caesarean section to deliver the baby, which brings its own set of risks.

Types

Open fetal surgery

Technique
Tocolytics are generally given to prevent labor; however, these should not be given if the risk is higher for the fetus inside the womb than if delivered, such as may be the case in intrauterine infection, unexplained vaginal bleeding and fetal distress. An H2 antagonist is usually given for anaesthesia the evening before and the morning of the operation, and an antacid is usually given before induction to reduce the risk of acid aspiration. Rapid sequence induction is often used for sedation and intubation.

Open fetal surgery is similar in many respects to a normal cesarean section performed under general anesthesia, except that the fetus remains dependent on the placenta and is returned to the uterus. A hysterotomy is performed on the pregnant woman, and once the uterus is open and the fetus is exposed, the fetal surgery begins.  Typically, this surgery consists of an interim procedure intended to allow the fetus to remain in utero until it has matured enough to survive delivery and neonatal surgical procedures.

Upon completion of the fetal surgery, the fetus is put back inside the uterus and the uterus and abdominal wall are closed up. Before the last stitch is made in the uterine wall, the amniotic fluid is replaced. The mother remains in the hospital for 3–7 days for monitoring. Often babies who have been operated on in this manner are born pre-term.

Safety and complications
The main priority is maternal safety, and, secondary, avoiding preterm labor and achieving the aims of the surgery. In 2008, open fetal surgery was considered a possibility after approximately 18 weeks of gestation due to fetal size and fragility before that, and up to approximately 30 weeks of gestation due to increased risk of premature labor and, practically, the preference for delivering the child and performing the surgery in ex utero/pediatric surgery, instead. The risk of premature labor is increased by concomitant risk factors such as multiple gestation, a history of maternal smoking, and very young or old maternal age.

Open fetal surgery has proven to be reasonably safe for the mother. For the fetus, safety and effectiveness are variable, and depend on the specific procedure, the reasons for the procedure, and the gestational age and condition of the fetus. The overall perinatal mortality after open surgery has been estimated to be approximately 6%, according to a study in the United States 2003.

All future pregnancies for the mother require cesarean delivery because of the hysterotomy. However, there is no presented data suggesting decreased fertility for the mother.

Indications
Neural tube defects (NTD), which begin to become observable at the 28th day of pregnancy, occur when the embryonic neural tube fails to close properly, the developing brain and spinal cord are openly exposed to amniotic fluid and with this, causes the nervous system tissue to break down.  Prenatal repair of the most easily treated NTD, myelomeningocele (spina bifida cystica) is as of 2011, a growing option in the United States. Although the procedure is technically challenging, children treated with open fetal repair have significantly improved outcomes compared to children whose defects are repaired shortly after birth. Specifically, fetal repair reduces the rate of ventriculoperitoneal shunt dependence and Chiari malformation, while improving motor skills at 30 months of age compared to post-natal repair. Children having fetal repair are twice as likely to walk independently at 30 months of age than children undergoing post-natal repair. As a result, open fetal repair of spina bifida is now considered standard of care at fetal specialty centers.

Other conditions that potentially are treated by open fetal surgery include:
 Congenital diaphragmatic hernia (if indicated at all, it is now more likely to be treated by endoscopic fetal surgery)
 Congenital cystic adenomatoid malformation
 Congenital heart disease
 Pulmonary sequestration
 Sacrococcygeal teratoma

Minimally invasive fetal surgery 
Minimally-invasive fetoscopic surgery has proven to be useful for some fetal conditions.
 Twin-twin transfusion syndrome – Laser Ablation of Vessels
 Spina bifida – Fetoscopic closure of the malformation. Prenatal repair of the spina bifida lesion through this approach has been purported to result in less complications to the mother, whilst affording benefit to the baby.

History
Fetal surgical techniques were first developed at the University of California, San Francisco in 1980 using animal models.

On April 26, 1981, the first successful human open fetal surgery in the world was performed at University of California, San Francisco under the direction of Dr. Michael Harrison. The fetus in question had a congenital hydronephrosis, a blockage in the urinary tract that caused the kidney to dangerously extend. To correct this a vesicostomy was performed by placing a catheter in the fetus to allow the urine to be released normally. The blockage itself was removed surgically after birth.

Further advances have been made in the years since this first operation. New techniques have allowed additional defects to be treated and for less invasive forms of fetal surgical intervention.

The first two percutaneous ultrasound-guided fetal balloon valvuloplasties, a type of fetal surgery for severe aortic valve obstruction in the heart, were reported in 1991.  Among the first dozen reported attempts at this repair in the 1990s, only two children survived long-term.
Dr. Oluyinka Olutoye, alongside Darrell Cass, from the Texas Children's Fetal Centre, removed a 23-week-old fetus from her mother's womb in order to perform surgery upon a spinal tumor she had. The girl was placed back in the womb after a five-hour surgery and was born without complications.

See also 
 ECMO
 Fetoscopy
 EXIT procedure
 Maternal-fetal medicine, a discipline of high-risk obstetrics and gynecology; most fetal surgeons were previously trained in OB-GYN and maternal-fetal medicine before their fetal surgical training
 Neonatology and neonatal surgery, related to high risk OB-GYN and maternal-fetal medicine and fetal surgery, are branches of pediatrics and pediatric surgery that focus on the treatment of newborn infants (less than one month of age)
 Pediatric surgery, a related but distinct discipline of surgery and pediatrics, involving surgery on infants, toddlers, and children and adolescents
 MOMS Trial
 Spina bifida
 NAFTNet
 Samuel Armas

References

Further reading
 

 
Surgery